Citizen Zero is an American hard rock band from Detroit, Michigan. Founded in Rochester Hills in 2010 by siblings Greg (bass), John (drums), and Matt Dudley (guitar) and vocalist Josh LeMay (FMR Mayyle) the band caught the ear of Kid Rock's recording engineer Al Sutton, who worked with them in Rustbelt Studios and recorded their eponymous 2011 debut EP. In 2012, Matt Dudley died, forcing the band to recruit new guitarist Sammy Boller  to finish up their second EP, 2012's Life Explodes. In 2013, Citizen Zero won a Detroit Music Award for Outstanding Rock/Pop Recording. In 2016 Citizen Zero secured a deal with Wind-Up Records and released debut studio album, State of Mind. Their debut single "Go (Let Me Save You)" peaked at #17 on the mainstream rock chart.

Personnel
Josh LeMay - lead vocals/rhythm guitar (2010–present)
Sammy Boller - lead guitar (2013–2018)
John Dudley - drums (2010-2018)
Sam Collins - bass (2015–present)

Former
Matt Dudley - lead guitar (2010-2012; died 2012)
Greg Dudley - bass (2010-2015)

Studio albums

State of Mind

State of Mind  is the debut studio album by American rock band Citizen Zero.

Track listing

Extended plays
Citizen Zero (2011) 
Life Explodes (2012)

Singles

Music videos

References

Hard rock musical groups from Michigan